St. Anthony of Padua High School (SAHS) is a private, Roman Catholic high school in Effingham, Illinois. It is located in the Roman Catholic Diocese of Springfield in Illinois. St. Anthony was established in 1874 by the School Sisters of Notre Dame.

Academics
St. Anthony High School offers AP classes in Calculus, Statistics, Chemistry, Biology, and English. Dual enrollment classes through Lake Land College include Composition, College Algebra, and Finite Math.

In addition, SAHS offers modified classes for those who may need academic assistance in certain areas.

SAHS is accredited by the Illinois State Board of Education and the North Central Association Commission on Accreditation and School Improvement (NCACASI), of which SAHS is a member.

Athletics 
St. Anthony of Padua competes in the National Trail Conference (NTC) and is also a member of the Illinois High School Association (IHSA).  The teams compete as the Bulldogs and Lady Bulldogs. The Bulldogs were awarded the Program of the Year by the Decatur Herald & Review after the 2016–17 school year.

The school sponsors interscholastic athletic teams for students in bass fishing, bowling, basketball, cross country, golf, soccer, tennis, and track and field. Boys may also compete in baseball, while girls may also compete in cheerleading, softball, and volleyball.

The following teams have competed in the IHSA sponsored state tournaments or meets:

The following individuals have won a state title at an IHSA State Tournament or meet:

Extra-curricular programs

St. Anthony High School's extracurricular activities include:
 Christian Service Program
 Christian Athletes for Christ (Formerly the Fellowship of Christian Athletes)
 Spanish Club
 Spanish Scholar Bowl
 History Club
 Scholar Bowl 
 Chess Club
 Chorus
 Band
 Pep Club
 Student Council
 National Honor Society
 WYSE (World Youth Science and Engineering)
 Trap Shooting Team

References

External links
Website

Schools in Effingham County, Illinois
Educational institutions established in 1874
Roman Catholic Diocese of Springfield in Illinois
Catholic secondary schools in Illinois
School Sisters of Notre Dame schools
1874 establishments in Illinois